The first 1962 Major League Baseball All-Star Game was the 32nd playing of Major League Baseball's annual midsummer exhibition game between the American League and National League. President John F. Kennedy was the second president to attend the event and threw out the first pitch. A highlight of the game was the first presentation of the Arch Ward Trophy. It was first presented in 1962 as a tribute to the man who helped found the All-Star Game in 1933. That first presentation went to Leon Wagner of the Los Angeles Angels (second game MVP) and to Maury Wills of the Los Angeles Dodgers (first game MVP), because two Midsummer Classics were played.

The spotlight on this game belonged to Maury Wills. Entering the lineup in the sixth inning to pinch-run for Stan Musial, he stole second then scored the first run of the game off a Dick Groat single. In the eighth inning, Wills reached base by a single. He rounded second on a short single hit by Jim Davenport to left field. Wills reached third base safely and scored on a foul out to right field moments later. This performance earned him the first All-Star Most Valuable Player Award. Roberto Clemente was a key contributor with three hits in the game.

Roster
New York Yankees manager Ralph Houk's coaching staff included Billy Hitchcock of the Baltimore Orioles and Jim "Mickey" Vernon of the Washington Senators, while Cincinnati Reds manager Fred Hutchinson's staff included Casey Stengel of the New York Mets and Johnny Keane of the St. Louis Cardinals.

Players in italics have since been inducted into the National Baseball Hall of Fame.

National League

American League

Game

Starting lineups

Umpires

Game Summary

References

External links
 1962 All-Star Game on Baseball Almanac
 1962 All-Star Game on Baseball-Reference.com

Major League Baseball All-Star Game
Major League Baseball All-Star Game
Major League Baseball All Star Game
July 1962 sports events in the United States
Baseball competitions in Washington, D.C.